From Hell to Paradise is a 1964 book by Swedish author Olof Lagercrantz about the work of Dante Alighieri.. It won the Nordic Council's Literature Prize in 1965.

References

1964 non-fiction books
Swedish non-fiction books
Nordic Council's Literature Prize-winning works